BAP Aguirre (CH-84) was a De Zeven Provinciën-class cruiser in service with the Peruvian Navy. It was completed for the Royal Netherlands Navy in 1953 as HNLMS De Zeven Provinciën. After two decades in service, it was decommissioned in August 1976 and sold to Peru. Before being transferred to the Pacific Ocean, it underwent a major rebuild program by Rotterdamse Droogdok Maatschappij (RDM) at its shipyard in Rotterdam. Modifications included the removal of its RIM-2 Terrier SAM system and the installation of a fixed hangar and a flight deck. The upgrade was finished on October 31, 1977 and the ship was commissioned on February 24, 1978 at the Dutch naval base of Den Helder. Renamed Aguirre, in honor of the Peruvian Commander Elías Aguirre, it arrived to its new homeport of Callao on May 17, 1978.

In service, the Aguirre participated in several exercises, including the multinational UNITAS manoeuvres. From August 7, 1986 through February 15, 1988, while the BAP Almirante Grau (CLM-81) underwent a major refit in the Netherlands, the Aguirre was temporarily renamed Almirante Grau and designated as fleet flagship. By the 1990s the ship systems were beginning to show their age, but lack of funds prevented any major upgrade. Finally, on March 21, 1999, the ship was decommissioned.

Sources
 Rodríguez Asti, John, Cruceros. Buques de la Marina de Guerra del Perú desde 1884. Dirección de Intereses Marítimos, 2000.
 Toppan, Andrew, World Aircraft Carriers List: Peru. http://www.hazegray.org/navhist/carriers/peru.htm 
 Jane's Major Warships 2003

De Zeven Provinciën-class cruisers of the Peruvian Navy
Ships built in Rotterdam
1941 ships

nl:Hr. Ms. De Zeven Provinciën (1953)